"Illusions" is a song by American hip hop group Cypress Hill. The song was released as the second single from Cypress Hill III: Temples of Boom. Two remixes of the song were released; one produced by DJ Muggs and one produced by Q-Tip.

According to James Masterton, the song marked a change in direction for Cypress Hill, "being more laid back than anything they have ever released before, so much so that it is almost ambient in tone."

Track listing

Chart positions

Notes
  "Illusions" did not enter the Billboard Hot 100, but peaked at number 3 on the Bubbling Under Hot 100 Singles chart, which acts as a 25-song extension to the Hot 100.

References

1995 songs
1996 singles
Cypress Hill songs
Ruffhouse Records singles
Columbia Records singles
Hardcore hip hop songs
Songs written by DJ Muggs
Songs written by B-Real
Music videos directed by McG
Song recordings produced by DJ Muggs